Little Crackers is a British Christmas comedy-drama that was broadcast on Sky1. It consists of a series of short films featuring stars of British and Irish comedy, including Stephen Fry, Catherine Tate, Chris O'Dowd, Kathy Burke, Victoria Wood, and Bill Bailey. According to Sky Television, the show marked the start of their biggest investment in British comedy during Sky1's twenty-year history. The success of the first series led Sky to renew the show for a second series, which began airing on 18 December 2011. The comedians involved in the second series included Harry Hill, Sheridan Smith, Sanjeev Bhaskar, John Bishop, Shappi Khorsandi and Jack Whitehall.

Moone Boy, created by and starring Chris O'Dowd for Sky1, and Walking and Talking, written by and starring Kathy Burke for Sky Atlantic, are both full series based on Little Crackers shorts. They have been commissioned for 6 episodes and 4 episodes respectively.

Summary
In the films, the stars – with the help of rising young actors such as Madeleine Power as the young Catherine Tate – recreate stories from their childhood. The films, which last between 10 and 12 minutes each, include Catherine Tate reenacting an occasion when she decided to mimic the controversial singer Gary Glitter in a school nativity; Stephen Fry as a head teacher doling out corporal punishment to his younger self played by Daniel Roche; and Dawn French as the Queen Mother, whom she met at the age of four. David Baddiel, Julian Barratt, Bill Bailey, Jo Brand, Victoria Wood, Chris O'Dowd and Julia Davis are among the other actors who recreate childhood incidents and memories.

Catherine Tate's Little Cracker, My First Nativity, was nominated for Best Comedy Programme, at the British Academy Television Awards 2011. It was beaten by BBC Two's Harry and Paul.

Production
The series was commissioned by Sky1 after the success of the short film series 10 Minute Tales in 2009. That series featured 12 silent short films of around 8 minutes in length and starred popular British actors (including Bill Nighy) and was directed by Ian Rickson.

Two of the episodes were produced by Silver River. The titles of the two episodes were revealed as "First Kiss" and "Satan's Hoof", starring Julia Davis and Julian Barratt respectively. A further three episodes were produced by Tiger Aspect: "Better Than Christmas", "The Queen Mother's Visit" (alternatively known as "Operation Big Hat") and "My First Nativity".

The first series of Little Crackers saw Catherine Tate, Julia Davis and Bill Bailey, marking their directorial debuts.

Broadcast
The show began airing on Sky1 and in high definition on Sky1 HD on 19 December 2010. Two episodes were broadcast each evening until 23 December, while the final two episodes were broadcast on Christmas Eve and Christmas Day.
The Meera Syal short was the UK's first ever scripted TV comedy broadcast in 3D.

A second series of 11 episodes was broadcast on Sky1 from 18 to 23 December 2011. A special behind-the-scenes look at the show was also broadcast and made available on Sky Anytime.

Episodes

Series 1 (2010)

Series 2 (2011)

Series 3 (2012)

References

External links

Sky UK original programming
2010 British television series debuts
2012 British television series endings
Television series by Tiger Aspect Productions
Television series by Sony Pictures Television
Television series by Warner Bros. Television Studios